Henrik Jakobsen may refer to:

 Henrik Jakobsen (handballer) (born 1992), Norwegian handball player
 Henrik Jakobsen (curler), Danish curler
 Henrik Plenge Jakobsen (born 1967), Danish conceptual artist